Erissoides is a genus of South American crab spiders that was first described by Cândido Firmino de Mello-Leitão in 1929.  it contains two species, both found in Brazil: E. striatus and E. vittatus.

See also
 List of Thomisidae species

References

Further reading

Araneomorphae genera
Spiders of South America
Taxa named by Cândido Firmino de Mello-Leitão
Thomisidae